Chief Squantz was a leader of the people of the Schaghticoke tribe who lived until 1724. Chief Squantz refused to sell the land that is now called the towns of Sherman, Connecticut, and New Fairfield, Connecticut, to a group of twelve colonists called "The Proprietors" who came from Fairfield to find land for a new colonial township.

Chief Squantz died during the winter of 1724–25, and his four sons and heirs refused to sell the land when The Proprietors returned in the spring of 1725. The land was later sold in 1729 for the equivalent of $300.

Chief Waramaug succeeded Chief Squantz in 1725 in sachemship of the Potatuck.

One of Chief Squantz's sons was Mauwehu, who was said by DeForest as having "possessed something of energy and commanding character for which his nation was once distinguished"; he succeeded Waramaug.

References

18th-century Native Americans
Native Americans in Connecticut
1720s deaths
Schaghticoke tribe
Native American leaders
Year of birth unknown